Liverpool F.C. Superleague Formula team was the racing team of Liverpool F.C., a football team that competes in England in the Premier League. The Liverpool F.C. racing team competed in the Superleague Formula.
They have been operated by Hitech Junior Team in all seasons, although the team changed name to Atech Grand Prix for 2010.

2008 season
In the 2008 Superleague Formula season Liverpool F.C. finished 4th overall in the table with 325 points. Spanish driver Adrián Vallés was the Liverpool driver for all rounds.

In the 2008 Zolder round, Liverpool F.C. won their first race, and also had the fastest lap in the first race.

Liverpool won their 2nd and last win of the 2008 season at the 2008 Estoril round.

Liverpool earned 2 pole positions at the Vallelunga round and the Jerez round.

2009 season
For the 2009 Superleague Formula season, Adrián Vallés was confirmed as the driver once again.

Liverpool won the opening round of the 2009 season at the Magny-Cours round, and they also won the Super Final.

Valles wrapped up the 2009 title with a solid fourth place for Liverpool in the final race of the season in Jarama.

2010 season
Liverpool F.C. will defend their crown in the 2010 season after the football club's director Ian Ayre confirmed they were contracted for several years.
However, in 2011 they confirmed that they would not be competing in Superleague Formula in the short-term.

Record
(key)

2008

2009
Super Final results in 2009 did not count for points towards the main championship.

2010

References

External links
 Liverpool F.C. Superleague Formula team minisite
 Official Liverpool F.C. football club website

Liverpool F.C.
Superleague Formula club teams